The Cambridgeshire Women's cricket team is the women's representative cricket team for the English historic county of Cambridgeshire. They play their home games across the county, and are captained by Lara Neild. In the Women's County Championship, Cambridgeshire played as a combined team with Huntingdonshire, as Cambridgeshire and Huntingdonshire Women, but since 2014 they have played individually in the Women's Twenty20 Cup, in which they have consistently competed in the lowest tier. They are partnered with the regional side Sunrisers.

History

1961-2013: Early History
Cambridgeshire Women played their first recorded game in 1961, against Middlesex Women Second XI. After this, they played in various one-off games and regional tournaments, before they joined the Women's County Championship in 2010 as Cambridgeshire and Huntingdonshire Women, under which they played until 2019, the final season of the tournament.

2014- : Women's Twenty20 Cup
From the inaugural season of the Women's Twenty20 Cup in 2009 until 2013, Cambridgeshire also competed as Cambridgeshire and Huntingdonshire. However, in 2014, the two counties split and competed separately. Cambridgeshire finished 8th in Division Four, winning two games, including a victory over Huntingdonshire. After this, Cambridgeshire have always played in the bottom tier of the Twenty20 Cup, achieving their most successful season in 2019, with three wins. In 2021, they competed in the East Group of the Twenty20 Cup, finishing 4th with 4 victories. They also joined the East of England Championship in 2021, and finished 4th out of 6 teams in their first season. The side withdrew from the East of England Championship in 2022, as well as finishing 3rd in their Twenty20 Cup group.

Players

Current squad
Based on appearances in the 2022 season.

Notable players
Players who have played for Cambridgeshire and played internationally are listed below, in order of first international appearance (given in brackets):

 Elspeth Fowler (2022)

Seasons

Women's Twenty20 Cup

See also
 Cambridgeshire County Cricket Club
 Cambridgeshire and Huntingdonshire Women cricket team
 Huntingdonshire Women cricket team
 Sunrisers (women's cricket)

References

Women's cricket teams in England
Cricket in Cambridgeshire